is a Shinto shrine located in  Gifu, Gifu Prefecture, Japan.

Images

See also

Ōmiwa Shrine
Mount Miwa

Shinto shrines in Gifu Prefecture